The Standing Committee on Public Accounts (SCOPA) (Afrikaans: Staande Komitee oor Openbare Rekeninge) is a standing committee of the National Assembly of South Africa, the lower house of the Parliament of South Africa. It oversees the financial statements of all government departments and state institutions, any audit reports issued on those statements, reports compiled by the Auditor-General on government departments and state institutions as well as any other financial statements or reports referred to the committee.

Membership
The membership of the committee is as follows:

The following people serve as alternate members of the committee:
Ganief Hendricks (Al Jama-ah)
Marubini Lubengo (African National Congress)
Thandiswa Marawu (African Transformation Movement)
Constance Mkhonto (Economic Freedom Fighters)

List of chairpersons
It is customary for a member of an opposition party to serve as chairperson of the committee.

References

External links
Page on Parliament of South Africa
Page on People's Assembly

Public Accounts Committees
Committees of the National Assembly of South Africa